The 2013–14 Chicago Blackhawks season was the 88th season for the National Hockey League franchise that was established on September 25, 1926. The Blackhawks were attempting to repeat as Stanley Cup champions, a feat that had not been accomplished in the NHL since the Detroit Red Wings won consecutive championships in 1997 and 1998.

Regular season 

As the defending Stanley Cup Champions, the Blackhawks kicked off the 2013–14 regular season on October 1, 2013, with a 30-minute Banner Raising Ceremony at the United Center to celebrate its historical 2012–13 season. Banners were raised to mark the Blackhawks's clinch of the Central Division, Western Conference, Presidents' Trophy and the Stanley Cup Championship. The Blackhawks then went on to defeat the Washington Capitals in its home opener, and became the first team since the 2008–09 Pittsburgh Penguins to do so. However, unlike the previous season where the Blackhawks were undefeated for the first six games of the season, they quickly fell against the Tampa Bay Lightning and division rival St. Louis Blues in the next two games.

On October 15, with a win against the Carolina Hurricanes, the Blackhawks celebrated its 2,500th regular season win in franchise history.

On January 29, with a win against the Vancouver Canucks, Joel Quenneville reached 693 coaching wins, moving him into sole possession of 3rd place in all-time wins.

On February 3, the Blackhawks played their 6,000th regular season game in franchise history with a 5–3 win over the Los Angeles Kings.

On March 1, the Blackhawks played in their 2nd outdoor game in franchise history at Soldier Field, Home of the Chicago Bears football team. The outdoor game was in part of the new NHL Stadium Series. The Blackhawks hosted the Pittsburgh Penguins as Captains Jonathan Toews and Sidney Crosby would play against each other for the first time ever. In front of a sold out crowd of 62,921, The Blackhawks defeated the Penguins 5-1 in a classic winter storm setting.

On March 19, with a win against the rival St. Louis Blues, Joel Quenneville reached 700 coaching wins.

Standings

Schedule and results

Pre-season

Regular season

Legend:

Detailed records

Playoffs

The Blackhawks qualified for the playoffs for the sixth consecutive season. As the 3rd seed in the Central division, the Blackhawks played the 2nd seed of the Central against the St. Louis Blues in the season's new playoff format.

During the first round against the St. Louis Blues the Blackhawks fell to an early 2–0 deficit in the series with two overtime losses of 4–3 each in St. Louis. The Blackhawks would rally back with 4 consecutive wins to win the best of 7 series. In game 3, Corey Crawford's stellar performance earned him a 2–0 shutout and the 1st star of the game. In Game 4, the Blackhawks had a 2–1 lead until the Blues tied the game with 4.6 seconds left in the 2nd period. The Blues would take the lead in the 3rd period with 7:33 left. The Blackhawks tied the game at 3 with Bryan Bickell's redirect with 3:52 left. In overtime Patrick Kane would score the game-winning goal with 8:43 left. With the series tied 2, game 5 would return to St. Louis with another overtime game as Jonathan Toews scored on a breakaway with 12:25 left to take a 3–2 series lead back to Chicago. In game 6 the Blackhawks would take 1–1 tie into the 3rd period. The Blackhawks would score 4 goals from Jonathan Toews, Patrick Sharp, Andrew Shaw and Duncan Keith to win the game 5–1 and the series 4–2.

The Blackhawks played the Minnesota Wild in the Second Round, a rematch of 2013 Conference Quarterfinals where the Blackhawks won in 5 games. This time around, the Blackhawks won in 6 games.

On May 4, Joel Quenneville won his 800th coached NHL game for both the regular season and playoffs combined. The Blackhawks won Game 2 against the Wild 4–1.

In a back-and-forth series against the Los Angeles Kings in the Western Conference Finals, the Blackhawks lost in 7 games.

Player statistics
Final Stats

Skaters

Goaltenders

†Denotes player spent time with another team before joining the Blackhawks. Stats reflect time with the Blackhawks only.
‡Traded mid-season
Bold/italics denotes franchise record

Awards and milestones

Awards

Milestones

Transactions
The Blackhawks have been involved in the following transactions during the 2013–14 season.

Trades

Free agents acquired

Free agents lost

Claimed via waivers

Lost via waivers

Player signings

Draft picks

The Blackhawks had the following picks at the 2013 NHL Entry Draft, which was held in Newark, New Jersey, on June 30, 2013.

Draft notes
 The Toronto Maple Leafs' second-round pick went to the Chicago Blackhawks as the result of a trade on June 30, 2013, that sent Dave Bolland to Toronto in exchange for Anaheim's fourth-round pick in 2013 (117th overall), Edmonton's fourth-round pick in 2014 and this pick.
 Chicago's second-round pick went to the Winnipeg Jets, as the result of a trade on February 27, 2012, that sent Johnny Oduya to Chicago, in exchange for Chicago's third-round pick in 2013, and this pick.
 The Winnipeg Jets' third-round pick went to the Chicago Blackhawks as the result of a trade on June 30, 2013, that sent Michael Frolik to Winnipeg in exchange for a fifth-round pick in 2013 (134th overall) and this pick.
 Chicago's third-round pick went to the Winnipeg Jets, as the result of a trade on February 27, 2012, that sent Johnny Oduya to Chicago, in exchange for Chicago's second-round pick in 2013, and this pick.
 The San Jose Sharks' fourth-round pick went to the Chicago Blackhawks as the result of a trade on June 30, 2013, that sent Anaheim's fourth-round pick in 2013 (117th overall) and a fifth-round pick in 2013 (151st overall) to San Jose in exchange for a fifth-round pick in 2014 and this pick.
 The Winnipeg Jets' fifth-round pick went to the Chicago Blackhawks as the result of a trade on June 30, 2013, that sent Michael Frolik to Winnipeg in exchange for a third-round pick in 2013 (74th overall) and this pick.
 The Chicago Blackhawks' fifth-round pick went to the San Jose Sharks as the result of a trade on June 30, 2013, that sent a fourth-round pick in 2013 (111th overall) and a fifth-round pick in 2014 to Chicago in exchange for Anaheim's fourth-round pick in 2013 (117th overall) and this pick.

References

External links
2013–14 Chicago Blackhawks season at official site

Chicago Blackhawks seasons
Chicago Blackhawks season, 2013-14
Chicago
Chic
Chic